Howard Craghead (May 25, 1908 – July 14, 1962), nicknamed "Judge", was a baseball player who played professional baseball in the 1930s. Craghead mainly played in the minor leagues, for the Toledo Mud Hens. Craghead did manage to pitch 23 innings during his career however for the Cleveland Indians, with no decisions and an earned run average of 6.26. He later became a Lieutenant Commander in the U.S. Navy during World War II. In 1974, Craghead was inducted into the Fresno County Athletic Hall of Fame.

References

External links 
 
 

1908 births
1962 deaths
Cleveland Indians players
Toledo Mud Hens players
San Diego Padres (minor league) players
Major League Baseball pitchers
Baseball players from California
People from Selma, California